The 1915 Buffalo Bisons football team was an American football team that represented the University of Buffalo—now known as the University at Buffalo—as an independent during the 1915 college football season. Led by Frank Mount Pleasant in his first and only year as head coach, the team compiled a record of 3–5.

Schedule

References

Buffalo
Buffalo Bulls football seasons
Buffalo Bisons football